Teracotona rhodophaea is a moth in the family Erebidae. It was described by Francis Walker in 1865. It is found in Botswana, Djibouti, Eritrea, Kenya, Namibia, Senegal, Somalia, South Africa, Tanzania, Togo, Zambia and Zimbabwe.

The larvae feed on Commelina species.

References

Moths described in 1865
Spilosomina